Poitras is a surname of french-canadian origin. It may refer to:
Anique Poitras (1961–2016), Canadian writer
Audrey Poitras (born 1950), president of the Métis Nation of Alberta, Canada
Diane Poitras (born 1951), Canadian video and film artist
George Poitras (1937–2005), chief of the Peepeekisis Cree Nation, Canada
Gilles Poitras, Canadian-born author of books relating to anime and manga
Jane Ash Poitras (born 1951), Canadian artist and printmaker
Jane Cowell-Poitras (born 1953), Canadian politician
Jean-Guy Poitras, Canadian badminton referee
Laura Poitras (born 1964), American director and producer of documentary films
Lawrence Poitras, Canadian judge
Marie-Hélène Poitras (born 1975), Canadian writer
Pierre Poitras (1810–1889), Canadian politician
Stacy Poitras American chainsaw carving sculptor
Tina Poitras (born 1970),  Canadian race walker
Tom Poitras, American soccer coach
Yvon Poitras (born 1948), Canadian businessman, politician and lobbyist